Ryan Poehling (born January 3, 1999) is an American professional ice hockey center currently playing for  Pittsburgh Penguins in the National Hockey League (NHL). Poehling was drafted 25th overall by the Montreal Canadiens in the 2017 NHL Entry Draft.

Playing career

Amateur
After playing two seasons at Lakeville North High School, Poehling was drafted first overall by the Lincoln Stars in the 2015 USHL Draft. He joined the Stars during the 2015–16 season after his high school season was over. In May 2016, Poehling announced he had graduated high school early and signed with St. Cloud State University for the 2016–17 season. He stated that part of his decision was due to his brothers committing to St. Cloud as well.

In his freshman season at St. Cloud, Poehling played in 35 games and recorded 13 points. He was also named to the 2016–17 NCHC Academic All–Conference Team alongside his brothers. Poehling was drafted in the first round, twenty-fifth overall, by the Montreal Canadiens in the 2017 NHL Entry Draft. Poehling went on and had a successful sophomore year with St. Cloud State. He notched 31 points in 36 games and helped his team win the regular season in the NCHC. Poehling scored the game-winning goal in a 4–2 win over the Denver Pioneers to help St. Cloud win the Penrose Cup as regular season champions.

Poehling participated in the Canadiens 2018 Development Camp prior to the 2018–19 season, however, he chose to return to St. Cloud State for his Junior year to try to win the national championship.

Professional

Montreal Canadiens
On March 31, 2019, Poehling signed a three-year entry-level contract with the Canadiens, joining the team for the remainder of the season. During his NHL debut in Montreal's season-closing game against the Toronto Maple Leafs on April 6, 2019, Poehling scored a hat trick, the first Canadiens player to achieve this feat since Alex Smart on January 14, 1943. This was then followed by a goal in the shootout, winning the game for the Canadiens.

Poehling split the  season with the Canadiens and their AHL affiliate, the Laval Rocket. Poehling was unable to replicate the success he found in his first game, scoring a single goal and assist each in 27 NHL games; his first AHL stint was also unremarkable, scoring 13 points in 36 games with the Rocket before the season was canceled due to complications of the COVID-19 pandemic.

His season was cut short, as on May 6, 2021, the Canadiens announced Poehling suffered a season-ending wrist injury which required surgery. He was unable to join the team as they went to the Stanley Cup Finals, where they were defeated by the Tampa Bay Lightning.

As a restricted free agent with the Canadiens, Poehling was signed to a two-year contract extension, with the final year of his deal on a one-way basis on August 27, 2021. On the heels of a successful season in the AHL, there were expectations that Poehling would make the Canadiens lineup in one of the centre positions vacated following the off-season departures of Phillip Danault and Jesperi Kotkaniemi. However, Poehling's performance in the pre-season was judged to be underwhelming by many. He was sent down to the AHL again on October 13, shortly after the Canadiens claimed centreman Adam Brooks from the Maple Leafs off waivers. After seven games with the Rocket, Poehling was called up by the Canadiens, who were plagued by injuries amidst a historically poor start. Poehling's play in this new stint in the roster attracted praise, notably managing a two-goal performance in a victory over the Nashville Predators.

Pittsburgh Penguins
On July 16, 2022, Poehling was traded to the Pittsburgh Penguins, along with defenseman Jeff Petry, in exchange for defenseman Mike Matheson and a fourth-round pick in the 2023 NHL Entry Draft.

International play
Poehling scored 3 points in the 2018 World Junior Championships to help Team USA win the bronze medal.

On December 24, 2018, Poehling was named to Team USA's roster for the 2019 World Junior Ice Hockey Championships. Poehling scored a natural hat-trick and one assist on December 30, 2018 against Team Sweden to help close a 4–0 gap and lead the game to overtime. While Team USA lost to Team Finland 2–3 in the gold medal round, Poehling was named the tournament MVP and best forward. He ended the tournament with eight points (5G, 3A) in six games.

Personal life
Poehling has two older twin brothers, Nick and Jack, who also play hockey. His uncle Stan Palmer played hockey for the University of Minnesota Duluth and was drafted 177th overall by the Montreal Canadiens in the 1977 NHL Amateur Draft.

Career statistics

Regular season and playoffs

International

Awards and honors

References

External links

1999 births
American men's ice hockey centers
Laval Rocket players
Lincoln Stars players
Living people
Ice hockey players from Minnesota
People from Lakeville, Minnesota
Montreal Canadiens draft picks
Montreal Canadiens players
National Hockey League first-round draft picks
Pittsburgh Penguins players
St. Cloud State Huskies men's ice hockey players